Process Lasso is Windows  process automation and optimization software developed by Jeremy Collake of Bitsum Technologies. It features a graphical user interface that allows for automating various process related tasks, and several novel algorithms to control how processes are run. 

The original and headline algorithm is ProBalance, which works to retain system responsiveness during high CPU loads by dynamically adjusting process priority classes. More recently, algorithms such as the CPU Limiter, Instance Balancer, and Group Extender  were added. These algorithms help to control how processes are allocated to CPU cores. Numerous additional automation capabilities exist, including disallowed processes and application power plans.

The paid (Pro) version has some extra features, such as the ability to run the core engine (Process Governor) as a system service.

Features
Among this program's features are the following:
 ProBalance - Dynamic priority and affinity optimization
 Persistent priorities and CPU affinities
 Performance Mode - A maximum performance mode that disables CPU core parking and frequency scaling
 Process Watchdog - Advanced IFTTT rules
 CPU Limiter - Limit Application CPU Use
 Instance Balancer - Spread application instances across CPU cores
 Instance Count Limits - Limit number of running application instances
 Power Profile Automation - Switch power plans when application is run
 Disallow Processes - Prohibit select processes from running
 Keep Running - Automatically restart processes that terminate
 Responsiveness Metric - Novel algorithm to measure system responsiveness
 SmartTrim - Selective, threshold-based virtual memory trimming
 Stand-Alone Background Core Engine (Governor)
 Group Extender - Enable group unaware apps to use more than 64 CPU cores
 Available in x86-32(bit) and x86-64(bit) builds

Users who take advantage of the programs advanced features; such as assigning persistent priority class and CPU affinities to services or programs which are CPU intensive should fully familiarize themselves with Process Lasso's documentation. While optimizing and parking specific services and programs CPU cores and fine tuning priority classes can enhance system performance; a user could lock their system into "full load" by incorrectly elevating a service or program which makes use of multi-threading; where by the program can make the system; including mouse and keyboard actions non-responsive.

Reception
The program was featured on FreewareBB, and received an "Excellent" rating from Softpedia, as well as a certification for containing no malware.
The application has a 4.63 rating (out of a possible 5) at MajorGeeks.com.
Editors at CNET gave it 'Outstanding', 4.5 of a possible 5 stars.

References

External links
 Process Lasso - Process Lasso Official website
 Process Lasso Documentation - Process Lasso Documentation

Computer performance
Computer system optimization software
Utilities for Windows
Windows-only freeware